Shah Sadar Din is a town and union council of Dera Ghazi Khan District in the Punjab province of Pakistan. It is located at 30°16'44N 70°43'49E and has an altitude of 116 meters (383 feet).  The village is located 240 miles south of Islamabad.

Due to its location near the Indus River, agriculture is the main occupation. Wheat, rice and cotton are important crops of this area. South Punjab is in the middle of Pakistan, and is flat land crowded with mango trees, date palms, sugar cane, Sufi shrines, and mud-brick villages.

Main Tribes
Most tribes living in Shah Sadar Din are Syed, Khosa Baloch, Dasti Baloch, Lashari Baloch, Jarwar Baloch, and the main tribe is Sanjrani Baloch.

Notable people
 Qandeel Baloch is said to belong to this town.
 Sardar Amjad Farooq Khosa (MNA) 
 Sardar Mohsan Atta Khosa (MPA)
 Muhammad Shah Nawaz Khan Lashari (Social Person)

References

Populated places in Dera Ghazi Khan District
Union councils of Dera Ghazi Khan District
Cities and towns in Punjab, Pakistan